Fossa GAA is a Gaelic Athletic Association club located in Fossa, County Kerry, Ireland. The club is concerned with the game of Gaelic football. It is a member of the East Kerry GAA board.

History
Located four miles west of Killarney, County Kerry, Fossa GAA Club was founded on 11 January 1970. The club leased a field from the nearby Liebherr firm in 1972 and the following year fielded its first senior team in the East Kerry League and Championship and in Division 4 of the County League.

Kerry, Munster and All-Ireland Junior Football Champions
Fossa won the Kerry Premier Junior title in 2022, beating Listry in the final after extra-time. They went on to claim the Munster Junior title after wins over Castlemahon in the semi-final and Kilmurry in the final. On 15 January 2023, Fossa faced Stewartstown Harps at Croke Park in the All-Ireland final. Fossa won by 0–19 to 1–13 in a bad-tempered game which featured six red cards.

Honours
Kerry Junior Football Championship (1)
 2016
Kerry Premier Junior Football Championship (1) 
 2022
Munster Junior Club Football Championship 
 2022
All-Ireland Junior Club Football Championship (1)
 2023

Notable players
 David Clifford
 Paudie Clifford

References

Gaelic games clubs in County Kerry
Gaelic football clubs in County Kerry